Mishkat Varma is an Indian television actor known for playing Kabir Kumar in Nisha Aur Uske Cousins.

Early life and family
Varma was born to a Punjabi father, Dilip Varma and South-Indian mother, Uma Varma.  He did his schooling from Bombay Scottish School, Mahim and attended Mithibai College. He is a trained dancer and was a part of Shiamak Davar's dancing troupe. His elder sister, Mihika Verma is also an actress.

Career
Varma started his career by modelling and appearing in various advertisements. He made his television debut in 2014 with Aur Pyaar Ho Gaya as Raj Purohit. He was nominated for Fresh New Face Male in Indian Telly Awards.

From 2014 to 2015, he portrayed Kabir Kumar in Nisha Aur Uske Cousins opposite Aneri Vajani. His performance earned him a nomination for Male Actor Of The Year in Asian Viewers Television Awards 2015.

In 2016, he played Josy Nair in Bindass's Yeh Hai Aashiqui which reunited him with Vajani. From 2016 to 2017, he portrayed Babbal Pratap in SAB TV's Ichhapyaari Naagin.

In 2018, he played Shaurya in &TV's anthology series Laal Ishq. In 2019, Varma portrayed Viraat in &TV's Shaadi Ke Siyape. From 2019 to 2020, Varma played Shikhar Shergill in Star Plus's Divya Drishti opposite Nyra Banerjee.

Since 2022, Varma has been playing Aarav Sanghani in Anandibaa Aur Emily.

Filmography

Television

Films

Web series

Awards and nominations

References

Living people
Indian male television actors
21st-century Indian male actors
Year of birth missing (living people)